Stargate Universe is a Canadian-American military science fiction television series and part of MGM's Stargate franchise. The series, created by Brad Wright and Robert C. Cooper, premiered with the first two parts of a three-part episode, "Air" on Syfy on October 2, 2009.

Canadian Screenwriting Awards
In 2010 Stargate Universe and Robert C. Cooper won the Canadian Screenwriting Award for the "Episodic one hour".

Constellation Awards
Stargate Universe has been nominated for fourteen Constellation Awards, and has won six, as of 2012.

Emmy Awards
Stargate Universe has been nominated for three Emmy Award nominations for "Outstanding Special Visual Effects for a Series", but lost to CSI: Crime Scene Investigation and Boardwalk Empire, respectively., with the 2011 award winners to be announced on September 18, 2011.

Gemini Awards
Stargate Universe has been nominated for nine Gemini Awards in 2010. The results will be announced on November 13, 2010 at the Gemini Awards Ceremony.

Leo Awards
Stargate Universe has been nominated for 17 Leo Awards.

Visual Effects Society Awards

In 2010 Stargate Universe has been nominated for one VES Award.

See also
List of Stargate SG-1 awards and nominations
List of Stargate Atlantis awards and nominations

References

External links
 Awards for Stargate Universe at IMDB

Stargate
Stargate